The archbishop of York is a senior bishop in the Church of England, second only to the archbishop of Canterbury. The archbishop is the diocesan bishop of the Diocese of York and the metropolitan bishop of the province of York, which covers the northern regions of England (north of the Trent) as well as the Isle of Man.

The archbishop's throne (cathedra) is in York Minster in central York and the official residence is Bishopthorpe Palace in the village of Bishopthorpe outside York. The current archbishop is Stephen Cottrell, since the confirmation of his election on 9 July 2020.

History

Roman

There was a bishop in Eboracum (Roman York) from very early times; during the Middle Ages, it was thought to have been one of the dioceses established by the legendary King Lucius. Bishops of York are known to have been present at the councils of Arles (Eborius) and Nicaea (unnamed). However, this early Christian community was later destroyed by the pagan Anglo-Saxons and there is no direct succession from these bishops to the post-Augustinian ones.

Anglo-Saxon, Viking and Medieval times
The diocese was refounded by Paulinus (a member of Augustine's mission) in the 7th century. Notable among these early bishops is Wilfrid. These early bishops of York acted as diocesan rather than archdiocesan prelates until the time of Ecgbert of York, who received the pallium from Pope Gregory III in 735 and established metropolitan rights in the north. Until the Danish invasion the archbishops of Canterbury occasionally exercised authority, and it was not until the Norman Conquest that the archbishops of York asserted their complete independence.

At the time of the Norman invasion York had jurisdiction over Worcester, Lichfield, and Lincoln, as well as claiming the dioceses in the Northern Isles and Scotland which were in fact independent.  But the first three sees just mentioned were taken from York in 1072. In 1154 the suffragan sees of the Isle of Man and Orkney were transferred to the Norwegian archbishop of Nidaros (today's Trondheim), and in 1188 York finally accepted it had no authority over all of the Scottish dioceses except Whithorn, so that only the dioceses of Whithorn, Durham, and Carlisle remained to the archbishops as suffragan sees. Of these, Durham was practically independent, for the palatine bishops of that see were little short of sovereigns in their own jurisdiction. Sodor and Man were returned to York during the 14th century, to compensate for the loss of Whithorn to the Scottish Church.

Several of the archbishops of York held the ministerial office of Lord Chancellor of England and played some parts in affairs of state. As Peter Heylyn (1600–1662) wrote: "This see has yielded to the Church eight saints, to the Church of Rome three cardinals, to the realm of England twelve Lord Chancellors and two Lord Treasurers, and to the north of England two Lord Presidents."  The bishopric's role was also complicated by continued conflict over primacy with the see of Canterbury.

English Reformation
At the time of the English Reformation, York possessed three suffragan sees, Durham, Carlisle and Sodor and Man, to which during the brief space of Queen Mary I's reign (1553–1558) may be added the Diocese of Chester, founded by Henry VIII, but subsequently recognised by the Pope.

Until the mid 1530s (and from 1553 to 1558) the bishops and archbishops were in communion with the pope in Rome. This is no longer the case, as the archbishop of York, together with the rest of the Church of England, is a member of the Anglican Communion.

Walter de Grey purchased York Place as his London residence, which after the fall of Cardinal Thomas Wolsey, was renamed the Palace of Whitehall.

Styles and privileges

The archbishop of York is an ex officio member of the House of Lords and is styled Primate of England (whereas the archbishop of Canterbury is the Primate of All England); he is referred to as "The Most Reverend", retired archbishops are styled as "The Right Reverend". As archbishops are, by convention, appointed to the Privy Council they may, therefore, also use the style of "The Right Honourable" for life (unless they are later removed from the council). In debates in the House of Lords, the archbishop is referred to as "The Most Reverend Primate, the archbishop of York". "The Right Honourable" is not used in this instance. He may also be formally addressed as "Your Grace"—or, more often these days, simply as "archbishop", or "Father".

The surname of the archbishop of York is not always used in formal documents; often only the first name and see are mentioned. The archbishop is legally entitled to sign his name as "Ebor" (from the Latin for York). The right to use a title as a legal signature is only permitted to bishops, peers of the Realm and peers by courtesy. The current archbishop of York usually signs as "+Stephen Ebor".

In the English and Welsh order of precedence, the archbishop of York is ranked above all individuals in the realm, with the exception of the sovereign and members of the royal family, the archbishop of Canterbury and the Lord Chancellor. Immediately below him is the Prime Minister and then the Lord President of the Council.

Present
The archbishop of York is the metropolitan bishop of the province of York and is the junior of the two archbishops of the Church of England after the archbishop of Canterbury. The See is currently occupied by Stephen Cottrell since 9 July 2020.

The Province of York includes 10 Anglican dioceses in Northern England: Blackburn, Carlisle, Chester, Durham, Liverpool, Manchester, 
Newcastle, Sheffield, Leeds, and York, 
as well as 2 other dioceses: Southwell and Nottingham in the Midlands and Sodor and Man covering the Isle of Man.

List of archbishops

Pre-Conquest

Conquest to Reformation

Post-Reformation

Archbishops who became peers
From 1660 to 1900, all the archbishops of York died in office or were translated to Canterbury and died in that office.

William Maclagan was the first to voluntarily resign his office in 1908, two years before his death. All of his successors who were not translated to Canterbury have also resigned their office before death, and (like all archbishops of Canterbury) have been offered a peerage upon resignation.

Assistant bishops

Among those who have served as assistant bishops of the diocese have been:
19291931 (res.): Bernard Heywood — overseeing the archdeaconry of the East Riding — former bishop of Southwell; became bishop suffragan of Hull (i.e., effectively the same role) and archdeacon of the East Riding
19641970 (ret.): Mervyn Armstrong, Adviser on Industry to the archbishop of York and former bishop of Jarrow
19691996 (d.): George Cockin, Rector of Bainton (until 1978) and former bishop of Owerri. George Eyles Irwin Cockin (15 August 190818 November 1996) was an Irish missionary in Nigeria. Educated at Repton and Leeds University, he was a Tutor at St Paul's College, Awka (1933–40) and then a Supervisor of Anglican Schools in East Nigeria (1940–52) before training for the ministry at Lincoln Theological College. He was made deacon in 1953, ordained priest in 1954 and served his title (curacy) in Kimberworth until 1955. He then returned to Nigeria as Senior Supervisor of Anglican Schools in East Nigeria until 1958; during which time he was also additionally made a Canon of All Saints Cathedral, Onitsha (Diocese on the Niger), 1957. He was elected the first bishop of Owerri in 1959 and served until his resignation in 1969. He was consecrated a bishop on 27 January 1959 by James Horstead, archbishop of West Africa and bishop of Sierra Leone.
19771994 (d.): Richard Wimbush, Priest-in-charge of Etton with Dalton Holme (until 1983) and former bishop of Argyll and the Isles and Primus

See also
Accord of Winchester

Footnotes

References

Citations

Sources

Further reading

External links

 

 
York
Diocese of York
York
York
York
York-related lists